Finn Rune Jensen (born 9 January 1957) is a Danish former motorcycle speedway rider.

Biography
Born in Haderslev, Denmark, Jensen started his speedway career at Ole Olsen's training school at Stoke in 1974. He joined the Haderslev Motorsport Club (Hvepserne) on his return to Denmark and finished in tenth place in the 1974 Danish Junior Championship. The following year, only his second in speedway, he won the championship, scoring 15 points. He was taken on by the Birmingham Brummies in 1977, where he spent four years, also winning the European Junior Championship in Lonigo in 1978. He represented Denmark several times in international matches. In 1981 he moved to Leicester Lions, scoring eight points on his debut. He was a regular member of the Lions team until a poor spell in 1983 saw him loaned to Reading Racers. His form picked up and he returned for the end of the season, but with the demise of the Lions at the end of 1983, he moved on to Cradley Heathens in 1984. After two seasons with the Heathens, he retired from speedway. He has since found success as an engine tuner.

References

1957 births
Living people
Danish speedway riders
Birmingham Brummies riders
Leicester Lions riders
Cradley Heathens riders
People from Haderslev Municipality
Sportspeople from the Region of Southern Denmark